This list is of the Historic Sites of Japan located within the Prefecture of Saga.

National Historic Sites
As of 1 August 2019, twenty-five Sites have been designated as being of national significance (including three *Special Historic Sites); Kii Castle spans the prefectural borders with Fukuoka.

Prefectural Historic Sites
As of 1 August 2019, forty-seven Sites have been designated as being of prefectural importance.

Municipal Historic Sites
As of 1 May 2018, a further eighty-one Sites have been designated as being of municipal importance.

See also

 Cultural Properties of Japan
 Hizen Province
 Saga Domain
 Saga Prefectural Museum
 List of Cultural Properties of Japan - paintings (Saga)
 List of Places of Scenic Beauty of Japan (Saga)

References

External links
  Cultural Properties in Saga Prefecture

Saga Prefecture
 Saga